Heiston–Strickler House, also known as the Old Stone House, is a historic home located near Luray, Page County, Virginia. It was built about 1790, and is a two-story, two bay, stone dwelling with a gable roof.  It has a one-story late-19th century frame wing.  It is considered one of the most handsome and best preserved of the Page County Germanic houses.

It was listed on the National Register of Historic Places in 1978.

References

German-American culture in Virginia
Houses on the National Register of Historic Places in Virginia
Houses completed in 1790
Houses in Page County, Virginia
National Register of Historic Places in Page County, Virginia